Mateschitz is an Austrian surname  of South Slavic origin. Notable people with the surname include:
Dietrich Mateschitz (1944–2022), Austrian businessman
Mark Mateschitz (1992), Austrian entrepreneur

German-language surnames
Surnames of Austrian origin
Germanized Slavic family names